This is the list of all players that appeared in Slovak national ice hockey team in the years 1940–1943 and since 1993.

Source:

1940–1943

Skaters

Goalkeepers

Since 1993

Skaters

 = active player

Goalkeepers

 = active player

References

Slovakia national ice hockey team players
 
Lists of ice hockey players
Lists of Slovak sportspeople